The southern spotted skunk (Spilogale angustifrons) is a species of mammal in the skunk family, (Mephitidae). It ranges from Costa Rica to southern Mexico. At one time this skunk was considered to be a subspecies of the eastern spotted skunk (Spilogale putorius).

Description
It is conspicuously coloured in black and white and resembles the western spotted skunk in appearance. It has anal glands beneath the tail which secrete musk which can be sprayed with considerable accuracy at a predator.

Distribution and habitat
The southern spotted skunk is native to Central America where its range includes Mexico, Guatemala, Honduras, El Salvador, Nicaragua, Costa Rica and Belize.

Behaviours
The southern spotted skunk is nocturnal and secretive in its habits. It climbs trees but mainly searches for food on the ground for the small mammals, insects, birds, eggs, grain and fruit on which it feeds.

Status
The chief threats faced by the southern spotted skunk are human activities such as road construction, wildfires and agricultural monoculture. Though not very common, it has a large range and is presumed to have a large total population, and it is able to adapt to disturbance to its habitat. For these reasons, the International Union for Conservation of Nature has assessed it as being of "least concern".

References

External links
 Animal rescue X: Southern Spotted Skunk

Southern spotted
Carnivorans of Central America
Carnivorans of North America
Mammals of Central America
Mammals of Mexico
Least concern biota of North America
Mammals described in 1902
Taxa named by Arthur H. Howell